The Upper Redfish Lakes are a chain of small alpine glacial lakes in Custer County, Idaho, United States, located in the Sawtooth Mountains in the Sawtooth National Recreation Area.  The lakes are drained by an unnamed creek that is a tributary of Redfish Lake Creek, which flows into the Salmon River.  There are no trails that lead to the lakes, although they are most easily accessed from Sawtooth National Forest trail 154 along Redfish Lake Creek.

The Upper Redfish Lakes are in the Sawtooth Wilderness, and a wilderness permit can be obtained at a registration box at trailheads or wilderness boundaries.  Just to the south of the Upper Redfish Lakes is Lake Kathryn.

References

See also

 List of lakes of the Sawtooth Mountains (Idaho)
 Sawtooth National Forest
 Sawtooth National Recreation Area
 Sawtooth Range (Idaho)

Lakes of Idaho
Lakes of Custer County, Idaho
Glacial lakes of the United States
Glacial lakes of the Sawtooth Wilderness